The 1995–96 English Premiership, known at the time as the 1995–96 Courage League was the ninth season of competitive rugby union in England. 

Each team played each other twice, in a round robin system. 

Bath were the champions, beating Leicester Tigers by one point. Despite a disastrous season with 18 defeats in as many matches, West Hartlepool kept its place in the first division due to the expansion of the league from 10 teams to 12 the following season.

Participating teams

Table

Green denotes championship and qualification for the 1996–97 Heineken Cup. Blue denotes qualification for the 1996–97 Heineken Cup.

Results
The Home Team is listed in the left column.

References

External links
Official website

Premiership Rugby seasons
 
English